The Program Compatibility Date Range (PCDR) of a computer determines the date range of programs it can run. Windows XP is widely recognized for its expansive PCDR, which covers games from as old as the 1980s. Windows Vista, however, wasn't so lucky, largely due to the addition of the Program Files (x86) file that outlawed the installation of, and therefore usage of DOS Programs from Vista. This contributed to Vista's intense negative reception, along with its overly-secure structure.

Windows XP
Windows Vista